Lepyrus is a genus of true weevils in the beetle family Curculionidae. There are more than 70 described species in Lepyrus.

Species
These 71 species belong to the genus Lepyrus:

 Lepyrus alternans Casey, 1895
 Lepyrus arctoalpinus Korotyaev, 1998
 Lepyrus armatus Weise, 1893
 Lepyrus asperatus Schaufuss, 1882
 Lepyrus bermani Korotyaev, 2008
 Lepyrus bimaculatus Dejean, 1821
 Lepyrus binotatus Schoenherr, 1834
 Lepyrus bituberculatus Cristofori & Jan, 1832
 Lepyrus brevis Schneider, 1900
 Lepyrus caesius Csiki, 1934
 Lepyrus canadensis Casey, 1895
 Lepyrus canus Gyllenhal, 1834
 Lepyrus capucinus (Schaller, 1783)
 Lepyrus caucasicus Korotyaev, 1995
 Lepyrus chinganensis Zumpt, 1936
 Lepyrus christophi Faust, 1882
 Lepyrus christophori Kleine, 1918
 Lepyrus cinereus Weise, 1893
 Lepyrus colon Germar, 1817
 Lepyrus costulatus Faust, 1882
 Lepyrus dahlii Cristofori & Jan, 1832
 Lepyrus dorsalis Reitter, 1890
 Lepyrus elongatus Zumpt, 1936
 Lepyrus errans Casey, 1895
 Lepyrus evictus Scudder
 Lepyrus flavidulus Reitter, 1908
 Lepyrus frigidus Lomnicki, 1894
 Lepyrus gamma Megerle
 Lepyrus ganglbaueri Faust, 1888
 Lepyrus gemellus Kirby, 1837
 Lepyrus geminatus Say, 1831
 Lepyrus germinatus Say, 1831
 Lepyrus gibber Faust, 1882
 Lepyrus griseus Melichar, 1912
 Lepyrus herbichi Reitter, 1896
 Lepyrus impudicus Cristofori & Jan, 1832
 Lepyrus japonicus Roelofs, 1873
 Lepyrus kabaki Korotyaev, 1995
 Lepyrus konoi Zumpt, 1936
 Lepyrus kozlovi Korotyaev, 1995
 Lepyrus labradorensis Blair, 1933
 Lepyrus merkli Korotyaev, 1995
 Lepyrus motschulskyi Faust, 1882
 Lepyrus nebulosus Motschulsky, 1860
 Lepyrus nordenskioeldi Faust, 1885
 Lepyrus nordenskioldi Faust, 1885
 Lepyrus notabilis Faust, 1882
 Lepyrus oregonus Casey, 1895
 Lepyrus palustris (Scopoli, 1763)
 Lepyrus perforatus Casey, 1895
 Lepyrus pinguis Casey, 1895
 Lepyrus quadriguttatus Sturm, 1826
 Lepyrus quadrinotatus Boheman, 1842
 Lepyrus quadrituberculatus Cristofori & Jan, 1832
 Lepyrus rufoclavatus Sturm, 1826
 Lepyrus rugicollis Desbrochers, 1895
 Lepyrus semicolon Billberg, 1820
 Lepyrus sibiricus Zumpt, 1938
 Lepyrus signatipennis Roelofs & W., 1873
 Lepyrus sokolovi Korotyaev, 1998
 Lepyrus staudingeri Zumpt, 1936
 Lepyrus stefanssoni (Leng, 1919)
 Lepyrus terrestris Motschulsky, 1860
 Lepyrus tesselatus Van Dyke, 1928
 Lepyrus tessellatus Van Dyke, 1928
 Lepyrus triguttatus Germar, 1817
 Lepyrus tsherenkovi Korotyaev, 1995
 Lepyrus variegatus Schmidt, 1856
 Lepyrus ventricosus Faust, 1882
 Lepyrus v-griseum Megerle,
 Lepyrus volgensis Faust, 1882

References

Further reading

External links

 

Molytinae
Articles created by Qbugbot